Aluminium isopropoxide is the chemical compound usually described with the formula Al(O-i-Pr)3, where i-Pr is the isopropyl group (–CH(CH3)2). This colourless solid is a useful reagent in organic synthesis.

Structure
A tetrameric structure of the crystalline material was verified by NMR spectroscopy and X-ray crystallography. The species is described by the formula Al[(μ-O-i-Pr)2Al(O-i-Pr)2]3. The unique central Al is octahedral, and three other Al centers adopt tetrahedral geometry. The idealised point group symmetry is D3.

Preparation
This compound is commercially available. Industrially, it is prepared by the reaction between isopropyl alcohol and aluminium metal, or aluminium trichloride:
2 Al + 6 iPrOH → 2 Al(O-i-Pr)3 +3H2
AlCl3 + 3 iPrOH → Al(O-i-Pr)3 + 3 HCl

The procedure entails heating a mixture of aluminium, isopropyl alcohol, with a small amount of mercuric chloride. The process occurs via the formation of an amalgam of the aluminium. A catalytic amount of iodine is sometimes added to initiate the reaction.  The industrial route does not use mercury.

Reactions
Aluminium isopropoxide is used in MPV reductions of ketones and aldehydes and the Oppenauer oxidation of secondary alcohols. In these reactions, it is assumed that the tetrameric cluster disaggregates. It is used in the Tishchenko reaction.

Being a basic alkoxide, Al(O-i-Pr)3 has been also investigated as a catalyst for ring opening polymerization of cyclic esters.

History
Aluminium isopropoxide was first reported in the master's thesis of the Russian organic chemist Vyacheslav Tishchenko (Вячеслав Евгеньевич Тищенко, 1861–1941), which was reprinted in the Journal of the Russian Physico-Chemical Society (Журнал Русского Физико-Химического Общества) of 1899. This contribution included a detailed description of its synthesis, its peculiar physico-chemical behavior, and its catalytic activity in the Tishchenko reaction (catalytic transformation of aldehydes into esters). It was later found also to display catalytic activity as a reducing agent by Meerwein and Schmidt in the Meerwein–Ponndorf–Verley reduction ("MPV") in 1925. The reverse of the MPV reaction, oxidation of an alcohol to a ketone, is termed the Oppenauer oxidation. The original Oppenauer oxidation employed aluminium butoxide in place of the isopropoxide.

Related compounds
 Aluminium phenolate
Aluminium tert-butoxide, which is a dimer [(t-Bu-O)2Al(μ-O-t-Bu)]2. It is prepared analogously to the isopropoxide.

References

Alkoxides
Aluminium compounds
Isopropyl compounds